John Jacob Janas (1910-1969) was an American politician who served as mayor of Lowell, Massachusetts and as a member of the Massachusetts House of Representatives.

Early life
Janas was born on September 4, 1910 in Lowell. He graduated from Lowell High School and took evening courses at the Lowell Technological Institute.

Political career
Janas began his political career as a member of the Lowell school committee. He then served fourteen years as a member of the Lowell city council and from 1954 to 1955 also served as mayor.

In 1962, Janas was elected to the Massachusetts House of Representatives in an upset victory. He was the first Republican to represent the 15th Middlesex district. Janas remained in the House until his death on December 5, 1969. Lowell's John J. Janas Memorial Ice Skating Rink, built in 1971, is named in his honor.

References

1910 births
1969 deaths
American businesspeople in insurance
American real estate brokers
Mayors of Lowell, Massachusetts
Republican Party members of the Massachusetts House of Representatives
20th-century American politicians